Qasr-e Falanj (also Romanized as Qaşr-e Falanj; also known as Kūshk-e Palang) is a village in Rayen Rural District, Rayen District, Kerman County, Kerman Province, Iran. At the 2006 census, its population was 106, in 29 families.

References 

Populated places in Kerman County